Chandan Prabhakar (born 29 September 1981), often informally referred to as Chandu, is an Indian comedian and actor.

Life and career 
Chandan completed his graduation in mechanical engineering from Hindu College in Amritsar. He has been married to Nandini Khanna since 2015, they have one child together. He is childhood friend with Kapil Sharma and have worked together in The Great Indian Laughter Challenge, Comedy Nights with Kapil and The Kapil Sharma Show. Some of his most popular characters are Hawaldaar Harpal Singh, Jhanda Singh, Raju and Chandu chaiwala.

He first started his career as a contestant in comedy show The Great Indian Laughter Challenge in 2007, in which he emerged as runner up. Then in 2010, he appeared in his fellow comedian Sunil Pal directorial Bhavnao Ko Samjho. After then he appeared in three Punjabi language films, Power Cut (2011), Disco Singh (2014) and Judge Singh LLB (2015). In the last one, he co-produced and co-wrote screenplay. While reviewing Judge Singh LLB, The Guardian wrote Judge Singh LLB as scrappy, winning slacker comedy. Jasmine Singh of The Tribune reviewed film as the one definitely a bail-out from the usual storylines. ABP Sanjha reviewed film as a good courtroom drama in pollywood. 

In 2013, he appeared in some episodes of Comedy Circus Ke Ajoobe. He achieved recognition while appearing regularly in his friend Kapil Sharma shows like Comedy Nights with Kapil, The Kapil Sharma Show and Family Time With Kapil Sharma.

Filmography

Films

Television

References

External links
 

Indian male comedians
Living people
Punjabi people
Male actors from Amritsar
Male actors in Punjabi cinema
Male actors in Hindi cinema
Male actors in Hindi television
21st-century Indian male actors
1981 births